Chicago Access Network Television (CAN TV) is a public, educational, and government access (PEG) cable television service in Chicago, Illinois. The organization is funded by cable companies as part of their cable franchise agreements with the City of Chicago. The companies are also required by law to carry the network's five channels.

History
In 1983, the Chicago Access Corporation (CAC) was established by the City of Chicago as an independent nonprofit tasked with managing the public access channels in Chicago.

Channels
CAN TV operates five cable television channels in Chicago. They are available on AT&T, Comcast, RCN, and WOW:
 CAN TV19: Public Affairs, entertainment, documentary and arts
 CAN TV21: Live, call-in Hotline shows, community events and arts coverage
 CAN TV27: 24/7 local news and information 
 CAN TV36: Religious and inspirational programming
 CAN TV42: Interactive community bulletin board with blues and jazz from WDCB-FM

Programming
Any Chicago nonprofit or resident can submit noncommercial content to CAN TV for free, and over 10,000 new, local programs are shown on the network every year. Submitted videos include independent productions and programs made using equipment and facilities provided by CAN TV.

Groups who produce programs using CAN TV's publicly accessible studio and equipment represent a wide range of communities, including seniors, attorneys, and people with disabilities.

Chicago-based nonprofits also host live call-in shows from a dedicated studio at CAN TV. These programs are shown live on cable television in Chicago and online, with topics including youth media training, neighborhood development, and domestic violence.

CAN TV also provides unedited coverage of community events in Chicago, offering live coverage of some events on cable television and online. Past coverage includes public forums, political events like protests and hearings, and arts events.

Programs produced by CAN TV include:
 Chicago Newsroom, where journalists and newsmakers analyze the week's top local stories.
 Perspectivas Latinas, which highlights community organizations serving the Latino community in Chicago. 
 Political Forum, which gives Chicagoans a direct line to their government.

Past community-produced programs on CAN TV include:
 Chic-a-go-go
 JBTV
 Labor Beat
 SAIC's ExTV
Independent programming carried on CAN TV includes:
 Free Speech TV
 Illinois Channel

Training and Equipment Access
Chicago residents can choose from a wide range of classes at CAN TV to gain the skills needed to make a video. After becoming members, residents then get access to the equipment they trained to use, including digital cameras, edit suites, and a TV studio.

References

External links 
 cantv.org

See also

 List of public-access TV stations in the United States

Educational and instructional television channels
American public access television
Chicago Public Schools
1983 establishments in Illinois
Television channels and stations established in 1983
Television stations in Chicago